Cornelius Joseph Ahern (10 July 1871 – 10 July 1955) was an Australian politician. Born in Victoria, he was educated at Xavier College in Melbourne and became a solicitor in Wangaratta. In 1913, he was elected to the Australian House of Representatives as the Liberal member for Indi, defeating the sitting Labor MP Parker Moloney. He was defeated by Moloney the following year, and retired from politics, becoming an insurance company director in Melbourne. Ahern died on his birthday in 1955.

References

1871 births
1955 deaths
Commonwealth Liberal Party members of the Parliament of Australia
Members of the Australian House of Representatives
Members of the Australian House of Representatives for Indi
20th-century Australian politicians